The Bught is an area of the Scottish city of Inverness. A "bught" is defined in the Dictionary of the Scots Language as follows "Bowcht, Bucht, n. Also: boucht; bowght, bought. [Flem. bocht, bucht, inclosure for swine, sheep, etc.] A sheep-fold; a milking fold for ewes."

It is situated between the River Ness and the Caledonian Canal in the west of the city. It is a recreational area and contains the sports ground Bught Park, Inverness Sports Centre & Aquadome, Inverness Ice Rink, Whin Park and the Ness Islands. There is also a caravan park and extensive playing fields in the area.

The sports fields are used as the home grounds for Inverness Blitz American football home games.

Due to the recreational nature of the area, there is very little housing and most people live in the nearby areas of Dalneigh and Ballifeary.

References

Areas of Inverness